Michael W. Kalaher (June 22, 1870 – February 12, 1957) was a member of the Wisconsin State Assembly.

Biography
M. W. Kalaher was born on June 22, 1870 in Walworth County, Wisconsin and attended high school in Lake Geneva. He graduated from the University of Wisconsin, and became a high school teacher and principal in Manitowoc. In 1906, he moved to Milwaukee, where he practiced law.

Political career
Kalaher was elected to the Assembly for Milwaukee County's Fifth District in 1908. He succeeded William Alldridge. He was a Democrat.

Personal life
He married Ella Charlotte Dassler in Manitowoc on September 2, 1908. They had one son.

M. W. Kalaher died at Deaconess Hospital in Milwaukee on February 12, 1957. He was buried in Holy Cross Cemetery.

References

People from Lake Geneva, Wisconsin
People from Manitowoc, Wisconsin
Politicians from Milwaukee
Democratic Party members of the Wisconsin State Assembly
Schoolteachers from Wisconsin
University of Wisconsin–Madison alumni
1870 births
1957 deaths